This is a list of films which have placed number one at the weekend box office in Romania during 2013.

Highest-grossing films

See also 

 List of Romanian films
 List of highest-grossing films in Romania

Notes 

 In its 4th weekend Child's Pose became the highest-grossing Romanian film at the time.

References 

2013
2013 in Romanian cinema
Romania